Chase is a city in Rice County, Kansas, United States.  As of the 2020 census, the population of the city was 396.

History

For millennia, the land now known as Kansas was inhabited by Native Americans.  In 1803, most of modern Kansas was secured by the United States as part of the Louisiana Purchase.  In 1854, the Kansas Territory was organized, then in 1861 Kansas became the 34th U.S. state.  In 1867, Rice County was founded.

In 1878, Atchison, Topeka and Santa Fe Railway and parties from Marion County and McPherson County chartered the Marion and McPherson Railway Company.  In 1879, a branch line was built from Florence to McPherson, in 1880 it was extended to Lyons, in 1881 it was extended to Ellinwood.  The line was leased and operated by the Atchison, Topeka and Santa Fe Railway.  The line from Florence to Marion, was abandoned in 1968.  In 1992, the line from Marion to McPherson was sold to Central Kansas Railway. In 1993, after heavy flood damage, the line from Marion to McPherson was abandoned.  The original branch line connected Florence, Marion, Canada, Hillsboro, Lehigh, Canton, Galva, McPherson, Conway, Windom, Little River, Mitchell, Lyons, Chase, Ellinwood.

Chase was laid out in 1880 when the railroad was extended to that point. The city was named after a railroad official. The first post office in Chase was established in 1881.

Geography
Chase is located at  (38.355682, -98.348743).

Climate
The climate in this area is characterized by hot, humid summers and generally mild to cool winters.  According to the Köppen Climate Classification system, Chase has a humid subtropical climate, abbreviated "Cfa" on climate maps.

Demographics

2010 census
As of the census of 2010, there were 477 people, 196 households, and 133 families residing in the city. The racial makeup of the city was 94.8% White, 0.4% African American, 0.6% Asian, 0.6% from other races, and 3.6% from two or more races. Hispanic or Latino of any race were 7.8% of the population.

There were 196 households, of which 33.2% had children under the age of 18 living with them, 46.9% were married couples living together, 11.2% had a female householder with no husband present, 9.7% had a male householder with no wife present, and 32.1% were non-families. 27.6% of all households were made up of individuals, and 16.3% had someone living alone who was 65 years of age or older. The average household size was 2.43 and the average family size was 2.89.

The median age in the city was 38.4 years. 27.5% of residents were under the age of 18; 9% were between the ages of 18 and 24; 21% were from 25 to 44; 24.9% were from 45 to 64; and 17.6% were 65 years of age or older. The gender makeup of the city was 50.5% male and 49.5% female.

2000 census
As of the census of 2000, there were 490 people, 195 households, and 138 families residing in the city. The racial makeup of the city was 94.49% White, 0.41% Native American, 3.06% from other races, and 2.04% from two or more races. Hispanic or Latino of any race were 6.73% of the population.

There were 195 households, out of which 30.8% had children under the age of 18 living with them, 59.0% were married couples living together, 7.2% had a female householder with no husband present, and 29.2% were non-families. 24.6% of all households were made up of individuals, and 11.3% had someone living alone who was 65 years of age or older. The average household size was 2.51 and the average family size was 3.03.

In the city, the population was spread out, with 29.0% under the age of 18, 6.1% from 18 to 24, 24.7% from 25 to 44, 24.5% from 45 to 64, and 15.7% who were 65 years of age or older. The median age was 39 years. For every 100 females, there were 87.0 males. For every 100 females age 18 and over, there were 87.1 males.

The median income for a household in the city was $32,361, and the median income for a family was $39,688. Males had a median income of $28,000 versus $20,139 for females. The per capita income for the city was $13,972. About 8.2% of families and 10.7% of the population were below the poverty line, including 17.5% of those under age 18 and 8.6% of those age 65 or over.

Education
The community is served by Chase–Raymond USD 401 public school district.

See also
 National Register of Historic Places listings in Rice County, Kansas
 Santa Fe Trail

References

Further reading

External links
 Chase - Directory of Public Officials
 Chase city map, KDOT

Cities in Kansas
Cities in Rice County, Kansas